Wylie Dewayen Turner is a former defensive back in the National Football League. He played two seasons with the Green Bay Packers.

References

Players of American football from Dallas
Green Bay Packers players
American football defensive backs
Angelo State Rams football players
1957 births
Living people